Perspektiva Stock Exchange (Stock Exchange “Perspektiva” PJSC) — one and only high-tech Ukrainian stock exchange, which has Ukrainian beneficiaries (1), domestically developed software (2), and the active use of electronic documents management (ED) and digital signature (DS), developed in full accordance with requirements of the Ukrainian law.

These are the most important distinctions in comparison with two other high-tech Stock Exchanges, which operates on the Ukrainian stock market (PFTS and Ukrainian Exchange). They use the software of their parent company Moscow Exchange, which belongs to state institutions of the Russian Federation (including the Central Bank of Russia).

2017 year results 

2017, the sixth year in a row, Perspektiva Stock Exchange ranked the first among Ukrainian Stock Exchanges in terms of trading volume. The results of 2017 shows that the share of Perspektiva SE was 62% of total trading volume of securities, leaving far behind the competitors PFTS and Ukrainian Exchange, controlled by Russian residents.

Trading volume of all kinds of securities on Perspektiva SE in 2017 totalled UAH 127 bln.

References 
 http://fb_perspektiva.proemitent.info/index.php?content=55 - Perspektiva SE emitent's info.
 http://buroit.com.ua/ - in-house software developer.
 http://fbp.com.ua/NewsEntry.aspx?id=5727 - Monthly Wrap-up, December 2017
 http://fbp.com.ua - Perspektiva's official website.

Economy of Ukraine
Finance in Ukraine
Financial services companies of Ukraine
Stock exchanges in Ukraine